Justice League is an American animated series about a team of superheroes, which ran from 2001 to 2004 on Cartoon Network. The series is based on the Justice League and associated comic book characters published by DC Comics. It follows the adventures of Superman, Batman, Wonder Woman, Green Lantern, The Flash, Hawkgirl, and Martian Manhunter. The series was immediately followed by Justice League Unlimited (2004-2006).

Series overview

Episode list

Season 1 (2001–2002)

Season 2 (2003–2004)
Starting this season, the episodes were produced in 16:9 widescreen which were letterboxed in 4:3 when broadcast.

Static Shock crossovers

Note: Chronologically, these episodes take place prior to "Starcrossed", as they make use of the original Watchtower and Shayera Hol still uses her "Hawkgirl" cover.

Other
The comic series spun off from Justice League (Justice League Adventures and Justice League Unlimited) are loosely set in the same continuity as the series. They occasionally use different characters, such as Blue Beetle, Mary Marvel, Power Girl, Black Lightning and Firestorm and sometimes contradict events already shown, for example Wonder Woman remembering the events from "The Once and Future Thing".

Matt Wayne (who wrote "Chaos At Earth's Core", "Flash & Substance", and "Patriot Act") wrote issues 37 and 38 of the comic. His stories are based on unused episode ideas.

References

External links
 Justice League animated @ The World's Finest
 World's Finest – Justice League Adventures Comic Guide
 World's Finest – Justice League Unlimited Comic Guide

Episodes
Justice League
Lists of American children's animated television series episodes